Santa Maria Regina Mundi a Torre Spaccata is a 20th-century parochial church and titular church in eastern Rome.

History 

The church was built in 1968–70. It is on a rectangular plan with rounded corners. It has three naves and an altar area aligned with the lantern, and a large polychrome glass window in the apse. The baptistery is on a square plan with a pavilion roof, connected to the body of the church by an exposed concrete beam, which also acts as a lintel. Pope John Paul II visited in 1986.

On 28 June 1988, it was made a titular church to be held by a cardinal-priest.

Titulars
Simon Pimenta (1988–2013)
 Orlando Quevedo (2014–present)

References

External links

Titular churches
Rome Q. XXIV Don Bosco
Roman Catholic churches completed in 1970
20th-century Roman Catholic church buildings in Italy
Carmelite churches in Italy